Anchor Bay is a freshwater bay forming the northern region of Lake St. Clair in the U.S. state of Michigan. It generally encompasses the waters north of a line between Huron Point (part of the Lake St. Clair Metro Park Beach, not to be confused with Port Huron) and the Middle Channel of the St. Clair River (which enters Lake St. Clair between Dickinson Island and Harsens Island).

Geography
It is just south of New Baltimore, Michigan and borders the townships of Harrison, Clinton, Chesterfield, Anchorville, Ira, Fair Haven, Clay, and several islands including Dickinson and Harsens. It is notable for the fact that Canadian waters lie to the south of the adjacent United States territory and make up a major portion of Lake Saint Clair.

It is fed by the St. Clair River, which flows southwards from Lake Huron and has an extensive river delta where it enters Lake Saint Clair, the largest delta of the Great Lakes System.
This bay is part of the Great Lakes System.

Naming
As early as 1710, the English identified the lake on their maps as Saint Clare. By the Mitchell Map in 1755, the spelling appeared as St. Clair, the form that became most widely used. Some scholars believe the name honors American Revolutionary War General Arthur St. Clair, later Governor of the Northwest Territory; however, the name Lake St. Clair was in use, with its current spelling, long before St. Clair became a notable figure. The lake's name and the general's name likely influenced the namings of St. Clair County, the township of St. Clair, and the cities of St. Clair and St. Clair Shores.

The name's origin has also been confused with Patrick Sinclair, a British officer who purchased land on the St. Clair River at the outlet of the Pine River. There, in 1764, he built Fort Sinclair, in use for nearly 20 years before it was abandoned.

Unlike most smaller lakes in the region—but like the Great Lakes—Lake occurs first in its name rather than at the end, reflecting its French origins.

Water quality
Anchor Bay is a part of the largest freshwater delta in the Great Lakes. Its current water quality is quite good despite past pollution incidents and a history of chemical bio-accumulation. A number of cities obtain their drinking water from or just downstream of the lake, and quality is closely monitored.

In the early 1970s, the Canadian and American governments closed the commercial fishery over concerns of bio-accumulation of mercury caused by the Dow Chemical Chlor-Alkali Plant in Sarnia, Ontario. Since 1949, Dow operated mercury cell plants there for the production of chlorine and other chemicals, discharging mercury into the river and contaminating the fishery. The fishery has remained closed, although studies indicate mercury levels are now well within safe ranges.

Boat clubs

Many yacht clubs (boating and sailing clubs) are along the lake's shores, including:
 Clinton River Boat Club (Club Island), near Harsens Island, Michigan
 Albatross Yacht Club, Anchor Bay, Michigan
 North Star Sail Club, on the Clinton River, Harrison Twp, Michigan

Public beaches

 New Baltimore - Beach at Walter and Mary Burke Park in Downtown New Baltimore, Michigan
 Lake St Clair Metropark - Harrison Township, MI
 Most of the small islands on the bay (Strawberry, Grassy Bends [locally known as "Grassy"]) have sandy beaches or sand bars to enjoy. Visitors should be aware that some of them are not family-friendly (notably that of nearby Gull Island, especially during Jobbie Nooner weekend).

Fauna

Many of North America's freshwater fish species are found in the lake throughout the seasons. Species popular with anglers include bass, bluegill, bullhead, catfish, muskellunge, northern Pike, perch, salmon, smelt, steelhead, sturgeon, trout, and walleye. Several invasive species also inhabit the lake, including zebra mussels, sea lampreys, alewives and round gobies.

See also
St. Clair River
Clinton River (Michigan)
Harsens Island

Footnotes

References

External links

Bathymetry of Lake Erie & Lake St. Clair - NGDC
National Data Buoy Center page for Lake St. Clair station LSCM4 Current weather conditions from NOAA
http://www.epa.gov/med/grosseile_site/indicators/hg-walleye.html

Lake St. Clair
Great Lakes Waterway
Bodies of water of Macomb County, Michigan
Bodies of water of St. Clair County, Michigan
Bays of Michigan